Inside the Madness: Kentucky Basketball is an American reality series that premiered on February 17, 2018 on Facebook Watch. It follows the players of the University of Kentucky Men's Basketball team as they make their way through their current basketball season and gear up for the upcoming NCAA tournament.

Premise
Inside the Madness: Kentucky Basketball give viewers "unprecedented access to the team and head coach John Calipari as they navigate through the season, prepare for the NCAA Tournament run and shape young men for the rest of their lives."

Production

Development
On February 14, 2018, it was announced that Facebook Watch had ordered a first season of show consisting of ten episodes. Executive producer were reported to include Tom Cappello and Jason Sciavicco. Episodes were expected to be released on Saturdays beginning on February 17, 2018.

Marketing
Simultaneously with the initial series announcement, Facebook released a trailer for the first season of the show.

Episodes

See also
 List of original programs distributed by Facebook Watch

References

External links
 

Facebook Watch original programming
2010s American reality television series
2018 American television series debuts
2018 American television series endings
English-language television shows
American non-fiction web series